Laguna Beach: The Real Orange County, better known as simply Laguna Beach is a reality TV teen drama show that premiered in September 2004 on MTV in the United States. After gaining popularity, the show returned for a second season. It concluded its third season in November 2006; the main cast from seasons 1 and 2 have since graduated, and season 3 began with a new cast of primarily high school juniors. The program, a reality TV series in genre, is presented in the form of a narrative, which is more common in drama series. All three seasons are presently available at the iTunes Store, in addition to the release of the first two seasons on DVD. The third season was released in the UK March 9, 2009.

Series overview

Episodes

Season 1 (2004)
Filmed from February to August of 2004.

Season 2 (2005)
Filmed from December 2004 to August 2005.

Season 3 (2006)

 Filmed from December 2005 to August 2006.

External links
 iTunes Store
 Laguna Beach (Season 3) Episode Guide MTV
 TV.com

Lists of American reality television series episodes